Carol Tyson (15 December 1957 – 12 June 2005) was a British racewalking athlete. She was a three-time competitor at the IAAF World Race Walking Cup and was twice a silver medallist.

Born to Jack and Peggy Tyson, both medical doctors, she attended Keswick School as a boarder and took up racewalking while there.  Women's walking was in its early stages of development and, along with Marion Fawkes, Tyson was a leading athlete for Great Britain. She claimed national titles at the 5 km and 5000 m distances in her early twenties, including two titles at the UK Athletics Championships and four titles across 5000 m and 10,000 m disciplines at the Women's AAA Championships.

She began to study medicine at King's College London but continued to compete in the sport. She entered an invitational 5 km women's race at the 1977 IAAF World Race Walking Cup. Contested mainly between British and Swedish athletes, Tyson placed second behind Siv Gustavsson. The event was upgraded to an official one for the 1979 IAAF World Race Walking Cup and Tyson formed a British 1–2 with Marion Fawkes, helping the British women to the Eschborn Cup team title. Her third and final outing at the 1981 IAAF World Race Walking Cup brought more modest results, with Tyson in 19th place. She also won the top level Coppa Città di Sesto San Giovanni race in 1981.

After retiring from racewalking due to an Achilles tendon injury, she worked as a paediatrician in New Zealand, London, Great Yarmouth and finally at Perth Royal Infirmary. She died suddenly at the age of 47 after having breathing difficulties. She left a daughter, Tara Flores.

International competitions

National titles
UK Athletics Championships
5000 m walk: 1980, 1981
WAAA Women's Road Walk Championships
5 km walk: 1977, 1978, 1980
Women's AAA Championships
5000 m walk: 1978, 1981
10,000 m walk: 1978, 1980

References

1957 births
2005 deaths
People from Keswick, Cumbria
British female racewalkers
English female racewalkers
Alumni of King's College London
Sportspeople from Cumbria